Miles of Smiles is an EP by the experimental band Black Dice, released in 2004.

Track listing
 "Miles of Smiles" - 13:12
 "Trip Dude Delay" - 14:20

References

2004 albums
FatCat Records albums